The 120th New York State Legislature, consisting of the New York State Senate and the New York State Assembly, met from January 6 to April 24, 1897, during the first year of Frank S. Black's governorship, in Albany.

Background
Under the provisions of the New York Constitution of 1894, 50 Senators and 150 assemblymen were elected in single-seat districts; senators for a two-year term, assemblymen for a one-year term. The senatorial districts were made up of entire counties, except New York County (twelve districts), Kings County (seven districts), Erie County (three districts) and Monroe County (two districts). The Assembly districts were made up of contiguous area, all within the same county.

At the New York state election, 1895, the state officers and state senators were elected to an exceptional three-year term (for the sessions of 1896, 1897 and 1898), so that the election of these officers would be held, beginning in 1898, in even-numbered years, at the same time as the gubernatorial election.

At this time there were two major political parties: the Republican Party and the Democratic Party. The Democrats were split into two factions: the majority supported Free silver and William Jennings Bryan for U.S. president; a minority supported the Gold standard and John M. Palmer for U.S. president. The Socialist Labor Party, the Prohibition Party, and the People's Party also nominated tickets.

Elections
The New York state election, 1896 was held on November 3. Congressman Frank S. Black   was elected Governor; and Timothy L. Woodruff was elected Lieutenant Governor; both Republicans.

The only other statewide elective office up for election was also carried by a Republican. The approximate party strength at this election, as expressed by the vote for Governor, was: Republican 788,000; Silver Democrats 570,000; Gold Democrats 27,000; Socialist Labor 18,000; Prohibition 17,000; and People's Party 5,000.

Sessions
The Legislature met for the regular session at the State Capitol in Albany on January 6, 1897; and adjourned on April 24.

James M. E. O'Grady (R) was elected Speaker with 112 votes against 34 for Daniel E. Finn (D).

On January 19, the Legislature elected Thomas C. Platt (R) to succeed David B. Hill (D) as U.S. Senator from New York, for a six-year term beginning on March 4, 1897.

State Senate

Districts

Note: There are now 62 counties in the State of New York. The counties which are not mentioned in this list had not yet been established, or sufficiently organized, the area being included in one or more of the abovementioned counties.

Senators

The asterisk (*) denotes members of the previous Legislature who continued in office as members of this Legislature.

Note: For brevity, the chairmanships omit the words "...the Committee on (the)..."

Employees
 Clerk: John S. Kenyon
 Sergeant-at-Arms: Garret J. Benson
 Doorkeeper: Nathan Lewis
 Stenographer: Edward Shaughnessy
 Journal Clerk: Lafayette B. Gleason
 Index Clerk: Ernest A. Fay

State Assembly

Assemblymen

Note: For brevity, the chairmanships omit the words "...the Committee on (the)..."

Employees
 Clerk: Archie E. Baxter
Financial Clerk: William C. Stevens
 Sergeant-at-Arms: James C. Crawford
 Doorkeeper: Joseph Bauer
 Second Assistant Doorkeeper: Eugene L. Demers
 Stenographer: Henry C. Lammert
 Assistant Journal Clerk: Sanford W. Smith
 Chief of the Revision Room: Jean L. Burnett
 Committee Clerk: William L. Coughtry
 General Committee Clerk: Jacob A. Livingston

Notes

Sources
 The New York Red Book compiled by Edgar L. Murlin (published by James B. Lyon, Albany NY, 1897; see pg. 133–177 for senators' bios; between pg. 136 and 137 for senators' portraits; pg. 179–279 for assemblymen's bios; between pg. 184 and 185 for assemblymen's portraits; pg. 404 for list of senators; pg. 513 for list of assemblymen; and pg. 712–716 for senate districts)

120
1897 in New York (state)
1897 U.S. legislative sessions